Slave station may refer to:

A collection and transfer location utilized in the slave trade 
A station having a clock synchronized by a remote master station in a navigation system 
In a data network a station that is selected and controlled by a master station